David Germain is a drummer who has played in several bands including Shadows Fall and Jaya the Cat. He was born in the United States, but is currently living in the Netherlands.

Biography 

Germain formed his first band with Tom Kennedy (guitar), Kevin Theroux (vocals), and Ausberto Acevedo (bass). They hit the scene as Centrifuge. He then joined Shadows Fall prior to recording their first album Somber Eyes to the Sky, replacing Adam Dutkiewicz, who was only there to temporarily help start Shadows Fall, and left a year after the tour supporting Shadows Fall's second album Of One Blood. He stayed in the band the for whole melodic death metal era of Shadows Fall. During this period the band opened for King Diamond, Fear Factory and Cannibal Corpse, amongst others.

After leaving Shadows Fall in 2000, Germain joined Boston, Massachusetts based punk/ska band Jaya the Cat, who have recorded three studio albums (Basement Style, First Beer of a New Day and the latest, More Late Night Transmissions) as well as performing on the live album Ernesto's Burning. Following a European tour, the band decided to go to Amsterdam for a few months and, after three years, are still living there. Germain is now touring with Jaya the Cat in both Western and Eastern Europe and will hit European summer festivals.

David Germain, also known as, "The Germ" or "The Knife", can be found drinking beer at the Boom Chicago in Amsterdam.

References 

1976 births
Living people
American rock drummers
American expatriates in the Netherlands
Shadows Fall members